Steven Allan Kampfer (born September 24, 1988) is an American professional ice hockey defenseman who is currently playing for the Tucson Roadrunners in the American Hockey League (AHL) while under contract to the Arizona Coyotes in the National Hockey League (NHL). He was selected by the Anaheim Ducks in the 4th round (93rd overall) of the 2007 NHL Entry Draft. Kampfer was born in Ann Arbor, Michigan, but grew up in Jackson, Michigan.

Playing career
As a youth, Kampfer played in the 2002 Quebec International Pee-Wee Hockey Tournament with the Detroit Little Caesars minor ice hockey team.

Collegiate
Kampfer played four seasons with the University of Michigan from 2006-2010, with 60 points in 147 games.
On October 12, 2008, Kampfer was involved in an incident in which he engaged in a late-night argument with a woman outside of a bar after she allegedly made flirtatious remarks to other men in order to antagonize Kampfer. After the argument, Kampfer engaged in an altercation with Michigan football player Michael Milano, a friend of the woman.  Words were exchanged before Milano attacked Kampfer, resulting in Kampfer suffering a serious head injury.  Milano was later convicted of aggravated assault.

Professional
On March 2, 2010, the Anaheim Ducks traded Kampfer to the Boston Bruins in exchange for a conditional 4th-round draft pick. The Bruins signed him to a three-year entry-level contract and assigned him to their AHL affiliate, the Providence Bruins, for the remainder of the 2009–10 AHL season.

Kampfer started the 2010–11 NHL season playing in the American Hockey League for the Providence Bruins, but in early December, he was promoted to the NHL, on an emergency basis, to fill in for the injured Mark Stuart. Kampfer made his NHL debut with the Bruins on December 9, 2010, skating 19 shifts (13:50 ice time) in a 5–2 home win over the New York Islanders.

Kampfer scored his first NHL point in his third NHL game on December 15, 2010, against the Buffalo Sabres. His first NHL goal was scored on December 28 against the Tampa Bay Lightning. Kampfer recorded his first multi-point game on January 13, 2011, against the Philadelphia Flyers when he scored the game-winning goal with 1:14 remaining in the game to earn the first star honors for the night.

Kampfer's high average ice time during his first 17 games as a Bruin, combined with the confidence shown by the coach in power play and key defensive situations, were intended to help make his case for a more permanent position on the roster, as when defenseman Mark Stuart was traded to the Atlanta Thrashers on February 18, 2011, center Rich Peverley was acquired in return, and Kampfer's continued presence with the Bruins proved valuable. His speed and ability to jump into the play, as recommended by the coaching staff, added a much-needed element to the Boston Bruins as of January 13, 2011.

Kampfer suffered a minor knee injury on April 9, 2011, while playing a game for the AHL's Providence Bruins, and he has been recuperating since that time. Unfortunately, he was not able to rejoin the Boston team during the 2011 Stanley Cup Playoffs. Kampfer played in 38 games, three short of what is required to have his name engraved onto the Stanley Cup. Though the team petitioned the league to include both Kampfer and injured center Marc Savard on the cup, Savard's name was included, but Kampfer was not. The NHL decided that since Kampfer spent the first 1/4 of the season in the minors, it was his first NHL season, and he was not dressed in the playoffs, so his name would not be engraved on the Stanley Cup. Boston gave Kampfer a Stanley Cup ring and included him on the official team picture.

At the 2012 NHL Trade Deadline, Kampfer was traded from the Boston Bruins to the Minnesota Wild in exchange for defensemen Greg Zanon.

On July 1, 2014, Kampfer agreed to a one-year two-way contract with the New York Rangers.  On October 6, 2014, Kampfer and Andrew Yogan were traded by the Rangers to the Florida Panthers in return for Joey Crabb.

During the 2016–17 season, Kampfer was placed on waivers after one game with the Panthers. After clearing, Kampfer was subsequently dealt back to the Rangers on November 8, 2016, along with a conditional pick, in exchange for Dylan McIlrath.

On September 11, 2018, Kampfer, a 2019 4th-round pick, and a conditional 7th-round pick were traded by the Rangers to the Boston Bruins in exchange for Adam McQuaid.

Following his 11th professional season, Kampfer left the NHL as a free agent and signed his first contract abroad in agreeing to a one-year deal with Russian-based Ak Bars Kazan of the Kontinental Hockey League (KHL) on July 5, 2021. Shouldering a greater responsibility and workload with Ak Bars in the 2021–22 season, Kampfer produced his highest points totals since 2014 in recording career-high 11 goals and 30 points through 46 regular season games.

As a free agent following Ak Bars playoff exit, Kampfer returned to North America and agreed to a one-year, two-way contract with the Detroit Red Wings on May 23, 2022. To begin the 2022–23 season, Kampfer was assigned to add a veteran presence to AHL affiliate, the Grand Rapids Griffins. He made 44 appearances on the blueline for the Griffins, posting 4 goals and 22 points before he was traded by the Red Wings to the Arizona Coyotes in exchange for future considerations on March 9, 2023.

International play 
On January 13, 2022, Kampfer was named to the United States men's national team to compete at the 2022 Winter Olympics as an assistant captain.

Career statistics

Regular season and playoffs

International

Awards and honors

References

External links

1988 births
Living people
Ak Bars Kazan players
American men's ice hockey defensemen
Anaheim Ducks draft picks
Boston Bruins players
Florida Panthers players
Grand Rapids Griffins players
Hartford Wolf Pack players
Houston Aeros (1994–2013) players
Ice hockey people from Ann Arbor, Michigan
Iowa Wild players
Michigan Wolverines men's ice hockey players
Minnesota Wild players
Sportspeople from Jackson, Michigan
New York Rangers players
Ice hockey players at the 2022 Winter Olympics
Olympic ice hockey players of the United States
Providence Bruins players
San Antonio Rampage players
Sioux City Musketeers players
Tucson Roadrunners players